The Black Bomber is a 1992 Yugoslavian drama film by Serbian director Darko Bajić. It takes place in Belgrade in a fictional authoritarian near-future, modeled closely on the conditions in Serbia at the beginning of the Yugoslav Wars. The film follows an anti-establishment radio host, Crni (Dragan Bjelogrlić) and the rock singer Luna (Anica Dobra), his friend and lover. The radio station Crni works for, Boom 92 (modeled after B92) is shut down as subversive, after which he sets up his own roving broadcast studio in a pickup truck, called "Crni bombarder" (The Black Bomber).

Cast
 Dragan Bjelogrlić - Crni
 Anica Dobra - Luna
 Srđan Todorović - Fleka
 Petar Božović - Besevic
 Dragan Maksimović - Psiho
 Boris Milivojević - Prki
 Žarko Laušević - Smajser
 Bogdan Diklić - Glavonja
 Danilo Stojković - President Bogdan Marković
 Bogdan Tirnanić - Opozicija
 Katarina Žutić - DDT
 Željko Mitrović - Marsovac
 Predrag Laković - Gazda
 Goran Radaković - Vaske

External links

References

1992 films
1990s Serbian-language films
Serbian drama films
Films set in Serbia
Films set in Belgrade
Yugoslav drama films
Films shot in Belgrade
1992 drama films